Dongal (also Romanized as Dāngal and Dāngol; also known as Dongān, Dūngir, and Dūnjīr) is a village in Garmkhan Rural District, Garmkhan District, Bojnord County, North Khorasan Province, Iran. At the 2006 census, its population was 337, in 90 families.

References 

Populated places in Bojnord County